J. Michael Riva (June 28, 1948 – June 7, 2012) was an American production designer.

Early and personal life
John Michael Riva was born in Manhattan, to William Riva, a Broadway set designer, and Maria Elisabeth Sieber, a German-born actress and the daughter of Marlene Dietrich. Riva had three brothers (John Peter, John Paul and John David). Riva attended the prep school Institute Le Rosey in Switzerland for six years before attending UCLA. Married to Wendy Mickell, he had four sons, Jean-Paul, Mikey, Daniel, and Adam.

Career
Riva had a long and prestigious career as an art director and production designer on numerous films, including the 1985 film The Color Purple, for which he was nominated for the Academy Award for Best Art Direction. Other credits include The Goonies (1985), Lethal Weapon (1987), A Few Good Men (1992), Spider-Man 3 (2007), Iron Man (2008) and Iron Man 2 (2010).

His final films, The Amazing Spider-Man and Django Unchained, were released posthumously. He was the production designer for the opening ceremony of the 1996 Summer Olympics in Atlanta, as well as for the 74th and 79th Academy Awards in 2002 and 2007, respectively. He won a Primetime Emmy Award for his work on the latter.

Death
Riva suffered a stroke on June 1, 2012, in New Orleans, Louisiana, during production of Django Unchained. He died in a hospital there on June 7, 2012, at age 63. Django director Quentin Tarantino commented, "Michael became a dear friend on this picture, as well as a magnificent, talented colleague."

Filmography

Films
All as production designer unless stated otherwise

Television
All as production designer unless stated otherwise

References
http://vimeo.com/3559547

External links
 

1948 births
2012 deaths
People from Manhattan
American production designers
American people of German descent
Emmy Award winners
University of California, Los Angeles alumni
Alumni of Institut Le Rosey